Wahyu Tri Nugroho (born 27 July 1986) is an Indonesian professional footballer who plays as a goalkeeper.

International career 
Wahyu Tri Nugroho receives his first senior international cap against Laos on 25 November 2012.

Honours

Club
Persiba Bantul
 Liga Indonesia Premier Division: 2010-11
Bhayangkara
 Liga 1: 2017
Persis Solo
 Liga 2: 2021

Individual
 Indonesia Soccer Championship A Best XI: 2016

References

External links 
 

1986 births
Living people
Indonesian footballers
Persiba Bantul players
Persis Solo players
Bhayangkara F.C. players
PSIS Semarang players
Liga 1 (Indonesia) players
Liga 2 (Indonesia) players
Indonesian Premier Division players
Indonesian Premier League players
Indonesia international footballers
People from Surakarta
Association football goalkeepers
Sportspeople from Central Java